Mesenteric ganglion may refer to:
 inferior mesenteric ganglion
 superior mesenteric ganglion